This is a list of women who have been elected as Members of Parliament (MPs) to the House of Commons of the United Kingdom.

1918 to 1935

1935 to 1950

1950 to 1965

1965 to 1983

1983 to 1997

1997 to 2010

2010 to present

Proportion of women 
Numbers and proportions are as they were directly after the relevant election and do not take into account by-elections, defections, or other changes in membership. Instead, women who were initially by-elected to their seats and later successful in holding them at a subsequent general election are counted as having won the latter to serve full terms, if completed.

See also 
 All-women shortlists
 Election results of women in United Kingdom general elections (1918–1945)
 List of female members of the House of Lords
 List of female political office-holders in the United Kingdom
 Parliament (Qualification of Women) Act 1918
 Records of members of parliament of the United Kingdom § Women
 Timeline of female MPs in the House of Commons of the United Kingdom
 Widow's succession
 Women in the House of Commons of the United Kingdom

Notes and references

Women
United Kingdom
UK